
Gmina Kodrąb is a rural gmina (administrative district) in Radomsko County, Łódź Voivodeship, in central Poland.

Villages
Gmina Kodrąb contains the villages and settlements of Antoniów, Antopol, Barwinek, Bugaj Dmeniński, Bugaj Zakrzewski, Dmenin, Dmenin-Józefka, Dmenin-Władysławów, Feliksów, Florentynów, Frachowiec, Gembartówka, Gosławice, Hamborowa, Józefów, Klizin, Klizin-Brzezinki, Klizin-Chaba, Klizin-Kopaliny, Kodrąb, Kolonia Rzejowice, Konradów, Kuchary, Kuźnica, Łagiewniki, Lipowczyce, Młyńczysko, Moczydła, Olszowiec, Przydatki Dmenińskie, Rogaszyn, Rzejowice, Smotryszów, Stefania, Teodorów Duży, Teodorów Mały, Widawka, Wola Malowana, Wólka Pytowska, Zabłocie, Zakrzew, Zakrzew-Czekaj, Zalesie, Zapolice and Żencin.

Neighbouring gminas
Gmina Kodrąb is bordered by the town of Radomsko and by the gminas of Gomunice, Gorzkowice, Kobiele Wielkie, Masłowice and Radomsko.

References
Polish official population figures 2006

Kodrab
Radomsko County